Cognitive Neuropsychology is a peer-reviewed academic journal aimed at promoting the investigation of human cognition that is based on neuropsychological methods including brain pathology, recording, stimulation, brain imaging or the study of developmental deficits.

The journal is published eight times a year by Taylor and Francis and its joint editors-in-chief are Brenda Rapp (Johns Hopkins University) and Bradford Z. Mahon (University of Rochester).

The journal exhibited unusual levels of self-citation and its journal impact factor of 2019 was suspended from Journal Citation Reports in 2020, a sanction which hit 34 journals in total.


Abstracting and indexing
The journal is abstracted and indexed in:

Applied Social Science Index and Abstracts (ASSIA)
Biosciences Information Service
Child Development Abstracts and Bibliography (CDAB)
Current Contents/Social & Behavioural Sciences
EMBASE/Excerpta Medica
European Reference Index for the Humanities (ERIH)
Linguistics Abstracts
Linguistics and Language Behavior Abstracts (LLBA)
MEDLINE
MLA International Bibliography
Neuroscience Citation Index
PsycINFO
PubsHub
Research Alerts
SciSearch
SCOPUS
Social Sciences Citation Index 
Social SciSearch
Social Services Abstracts
Sociological Abstracts
UnCover

References

External links

Cognitive science journals
8 times per year journals
English-language journals
Neuroscience journals
Publications established in 1984
Taylor & Francis academic journals